Tuna salad starts with a blend of two main ingredients: tuna and mayonnaise. The tuna used is usually pre-cooked, canned, and packaged in water or oil. Pickles, celery, relish, and onion are foremost among the ingredients that are often added. When the mixture is placed on bread, it makes a tuna salad sandwich. Tuna salad is also regularly served by itself, or on top of crackers, lettuce, tomato, or avocado. Chopped boiled eggs may be added. Relish adds a piquant flavor yet, unlike commonly added vegetables, requires no chopping.

Dishes 
In Belgium, the dish pêches au thon/perziken met tonijn ('peaches with tuna') is made from halved canned or fresh peaches stuffed with tuna salad. It is widespread throughout the country, and, due to its ease of preparation, it is common fare at potlucks.

In the United States, tuna salad is often considered its own dish. However, it may be added to noodles with its standard ingredients (onions, mayonnaise, and celery) to make a tuna pasta salad. Tuna salad is also commonly seen in American salad bars.

History
Tuna salad has been eaten for over 100 years. The first written reference to tuna salad, in America, appeared in 1907, and by 1914 dozens of recipes had been published. Tuna salad, especially with celery, is similar to chicken salad while also being more convenient (due to the use of canned tuna), a fact that helped its early rise in popularity.

Due to the high nutritional content of tuna salad, it assumed the reputation of a diet food in the 1960s.

See also

 Egg salad
 List of salads
 List of tuna dishes
 Niçoise salad

References

Fish salads
Tuna dishes